Gijs Brouwer and Reese Stalder were the defending champions but only Stalder chose to defend his title, partnering Evan King. Stalder lost in the first round to André Göransson and Ben McLachlan.

Robert Galloway and Miguel Ángel Reyes-Varela won the title after Göransson and McLachlan retired trailing 0–3 in the first set in the final.

Seeds

Draw

References

External links
 Main draw

Puerto Vallarta Open - Doubles